Visoko is a city located in the Zenica-Doboj Canton of the Federation of Bosnia and Herzegovina, an entity of Bosnia and Herzegovina. As of 2013, the municipality had a population of 39,938 inhabitants with 11,205 living in Visoko town. Located between Zenica and Sarajevo, Visoko lies where the river Fojnica joins the Bosna.

The Visoko region has evidence of long continuous occupation, with the first traces of life dating back to the 5th millennium BC. Archaeological excavations of Okolište have found one of the biggest neolithic settlements of the Butmir culture in southeastern Europe.

It was an early political and commercial center of the Bosnian medieval state, and the site where the first Bosnian king Tvrtko I was crowned. The Old town Visoki, located on Visočica hill, was a politically important fortress, and its inner bailey Podvisoki was an early example of a Bosnian medieval urban area. After the fall of the Kingdom of Bosnia, medieval Visoko grew as an Ottoman town. A key role in its development was played by the local Bosnian Ajas-pasha

Ottoman rule ended in 1878 when the Bosnian Vilayet was occupied by Austria-Hungary. On 11 November 1911, in the last years of Austro-Hungarian rule, it was almost completely burned down by an accidental fire. Before the Bosnian War, Visoko was the largest exporter of textile and leather in socialist Yugoslavia As of 2006, Visoko attracts tens of thousands of tourists every year, mainly because of Semir Osmanagić's claims.

Geography
The Visoko municipality covers 232 square kilometres with several characteristic, morphologically distinctive valleys formed by the foothills of the Central Bosnian mountains including Ozren, Vranica and Zvijezda. The altitude of the region ranges from 400 to 1,050 metres. Visoko's natural environment is defined by the river-valleys of the Bosna and Fojnica rivers. The municipality borders the towns of Kiseljak, Busovača, Kakanj, Vareš, Breza, Ilijaš and Ilidža, and is connected by rail to the Adriatic coast.

Infrastructure 
Visoko is directly connected to a highway along the European route E73 (A1 motorway) which directly connects it with Zenica and Sarajevo, which then continues to M17 road. It is connected to other places by the regional road R443 (Visoko - Kiseljak - Kreševo - Tarčin). It is located along the Šamac-Sarajevo railway. Visokogas is a public company in charge of the supply of natural gas, which supplies majority of city itself and some surrounding local communities.

Demographics

History

Prehistoric era
The Visoko region shows evidence of long continuous occupation, with the first traces of life dating back to Paleolithic. Because of the two rivers that go through Visoko, the Bosna and Fojnica, the Visoko basin was always fertile land for agriculture. In the Neolithic period, the area of Central Bosnia played an important role as a mediator between the settlements of Adriatic Coast and the central Balkans. These metropolitan areas were connected by Neretva and Bosna rivers. Since Visoko was situated on the Bosna River, it has gained a lot of economic traffic between the two larger cities. Neolithic emplacements were founded on the shores of the rivers in places known today as Arnautovići, Donje Moštre, Okolište, Zbilje, Ginje, and Dvor. Arnautovići and Okolište were identified as part of Kakanj culture.

In September 2007 the National Museum of Bosnia and Herzegovina continued archaeological excavations of Okolište, where it is estimated that around 3,000 people lived in the fortified settlement during the Neolithic Age making it one of the biggest in Southeastern Europe. This settlement belonged to the Butmir culture. The age of settlement is estimated by Radiocarbon dating to be around 4700 to 4500 years BC. Later on, neolithic cultures came in contact with other cultures like Baden. Around 3000 B.C.E. first signs of Chalcolithic culture appear which can be contributed to Vučedol culture of south Bosnian type, with findings in Donje Moštre and at the location of Old town of Visoki.

Illyria and Roman empire
The Visoko area was inhabited by the Illyirian tribe of Daesitiates. They descended from Bronze Age and Iron Age culture called Central Bosnian culture group which was closely related to Glasinac culture. Best known archaeological evidence is grave of group of warriors dated to 4 B.C.E. found in Gornji Skladovi, Vratnica. The Roman empire established its rule in 9 AD and built roads and fortresses in places like Kralupi, Seoča and Mokronozi. Area of Visoko was part of Roman province Illyricum.

Medieval Bosnia (958–1463)

Migration period saw introduction of new people to the Balkans - Slavs. Native Illyirian tribes through time became slavicized, but a lot of toponyms remained Illyirian in origin, like in example name of the river Bosna, which is namesake of country itself, but also a term for settlement which was used to reference the place called Bosna that existed in today's area of Visoko. It is considered that this area in Visoko basin was nucleus of new medieval Bosnian state which emerged in around 1000 AD. Only later on with construction of Old town of Visoki the term Bosna for the settlement would be rarely used.

Visoko is named after the Visoki Castle and the town of Visoki, which occupied Visočica hill. Podvisoki, Mile (today's Arnautovići), Biskupići and Moštre – together known as Visoko valley - were the early center of the medieval Bosnian kingdom. Many historical charters were made and written in Visoko valley, including the charter of first Bosnian king Tvrtko I Kotromanić in 1355, in castro nostro Vizoka vocatum which was also the first direct mention of the town of Visoki. Visoki was also a place where many important documents and legislation of medieval Bosnia were signed and written. The town of Visoki had a defensive role in protecting trade center Podvisoki (Subvisoki) which was located just below the town and was one of earliest examples of the medieval urban environments in Bosnia. Podvisoki was long time main trade center in medieval Bosnia.

The Rusag met at Mile, where Tvrtko I was crowned in 1377 and eventually buried alongside his uncle, Stjepan II Kotromanić, the Ban of Bosnia who preceded him. The Medieval Bosnian State Archive was also located there. Mile is today known for its many ornamented tombs of kings, bans and other former rulers. Ban Kulin's Plate (dating from 1193) was discovered at Biskupići, along with the remains of another medieval church, grave sites and the foundations of several other contemporary structures. Moštre's university was knows for its scholarship in medicine, theology, cosmogeny and ethics, although because of its connection to the Bosnian Church, nothing remains of its archives. Its existence is documented only by a handful of references in the Vatican archives of its enemy, the Catholic Church.

Other notable medieval settlements in the vicinity included Sebinje town, Čajan town in Gračanica – which protected the roads between Visoko and Bobovac – and the town of Bedem i Goduša.

Ottoman Empire (1463–1878)

The area of Visoko was conquered by Ottoman Empire around 1463, and it is from this time period that modern Visoko was formed. The founder of the town of Visoko was Ajas-beg (pasha), who was originally from Visoko but converted to Islam from Bogomilism. Visoko was a municipality at that time. From 1483, a voivod served at the head of the Visoko municipality, who together with the serdar (military commander) was the representative of the military and administration. The main imam (reisu-l-eimme), who existed in Visoko, fulfilled religious duties and duties to society. The court (or judicial) administration was carried out by the naib (or judge), who received help for bringing decisions by a jury of respected people from Visoko. The naib effected the law and his court according to sheriat.

During his rule, up to 1477, Ajas-beg built hammam, a religious primary school (mekteb), an aqueduct, bridge on the river Bosna, and a madrassa (Islamic high school), and also founded Dervish tekke (monastery), which is preserved to this day. In a short period, Visoko developed into the administrative center of the municipality and into the heart of trade and crafts, as well as the heart of cultural and spiritual life in the region. Visoko by then had the imbibe look of an Islamic oriental-style town with all the religious and cultural institutions.

Austro-Hungarian Empire (1878–1918)

The Vilayet of Bosnia was occupied by Austro-Hungary in 1878 (officially annexed in 1908) and only small local militias showed resistance and fought. In the early years of Austro-Hungarian rule, Visoko did not significantly change and kept its oriental-style look. In 1882, Visoko was an organized settlement with developed trade, offices, and other institutions. Increasing contact with western culture directed Visoko's style in a slightly different way such that buildings of that time were built in Pseudo-Moorish style. The Tabhana mosque was founded in Visoko center and the city itself was expanded further to the banks of the Fojnica River.  The main street was developed towards the town of Jalija, located at the delta of and a bridge across the Bosna River.

The first buildings of this period included the train station from 1882, the court building from 1895, a church with a Franciscan gymnasium (1899–1900), the municipality office, and a primary school from 1910. All were mainly built in the pseudo-Moorish style. Further development of the city was stalled by jangija, the big fire in 1911. The upper city area was completely burned, as well all the houses down the main street alongside Beledija, Shadrvan mosque and the high school. In all, 450 homes, stores and other small buildings were burned down. In the spring of 1912, the rebuilding of the city started and the government decided that all houses would be built with bricks and a tile roof in a traditional Bosnian style. After the mayor rebuilt Visoko, it had a unique mix of oriental and Western styles. Some houses from this time period still stand in the old district of the town.

Kingdom of Yugoslavia, NDH and WWII (1918–45)
After World War I and the defeat of Austria-Hungary in 1918, Visoko was incorporated into the new Kingdom of Yugoslavia. In the new state, the structure of houses did not change nor did the town develop. At the outbreak of the Second World War, Visoko was included in the newly formed Nazi Germany-sponsored Independent State of Croatia. Allied bombers pursued German and NDH forces and dropped nine bombs in the Visoko area, destroying strategic targets.  Throughout the war, the town was not a battlefront and did not suffer much damage from the war itself. However, of the 1205 soldiers from the Visoko area, 142 of them were killed during the war. Visoko was liberated on 7 April 1945 by the 7th, 9th and 17th Krajina brigades from the Tenth division of the forces of the Yugoslav Partisans.

SFR Yugoslavia (1945–92)

After World War II, Visoko, like many other towns in Bosnia, began industrialisation and further urban expansion. From 1950, the town expanded to the extensive lowlands along Bosna and Fojnica shores, which were mostly used as farms. For ages, Visoko was known for its quality leather industry and with new age of industrialisation, the biggest leather company in Yugoslavia, KTK, had its headquarters in Visoko. Besides the leather industry, Visoko was distinctive for its textile, trade, metal and food industries, making the town one of the largest exporters in Socialist Yugoslavia. By 1991, Visoko had 92,5 million dollars of exported good, with 80 million of that from KTK's leather industry. Due to the economic success of Visoko, Yugoslav president Josip Broz Tito came to Visoko to visit the factories and the town itself.

During this period, the town developed necessary institutions like a post office, police and fire stations, health care, hotels, supermarkets, sport stadiums, and halls. Culture bloomed with the founding of a theatre, museum, cinema and library. Education was also improved by building three new schools: a primary Safvet-beg Bašagić, two high schools with a gymnasium and mixed high school center, Hazim Šabanović. In 1983 Zlatko Ugljen received Aga Khan Award for Architecture for Šerefudin's White Mosque. The late 1980s and early 1990s were years of hasty urbanization and building of whole settlements like Luke which represents the most densely populated area of Visoko.

In 1953, Visoko's handball club, RK Bosna, (previously Vitex) was founded and eventually competed in the first Yugoslavia handball league. A football club called Bosna was created in 1953 by merging two existing clubs Jadran (founded 1923) and Radnički (founded 1934). Aero club Izet Kurtalić is also one of the successful clubs which won numerous gold and other medals in Yugoslavia.

Bosnian War (1992–95)

On 6 April 1992, a state of emergency was proclaimed, with local Serbs already armed and surrounding the town. Local residents began to arm themselves or were armed by the Bosniak SDA party. The quick reaction of the local population prevented the town's capture by seizing two local JNA barracks finally on 26 April, where newly formed local TO (territory defence) forces captured most of the arms in the barracks, which was a turning point at the start of the war in the Visoko area. 

The end of January embarked conflict between the Bosnian Croat HVO and Army of Bosnia & Herzegovina (which succeed TO). On 27 January Visoko and neighbouring units prevented the blockade of Fojnica. On 2 November ARBiH units captured nearby HVO-held Vareš. The last days of 1994 brought a ceasefire between HVO and ARBiH, forming a united Federation and begin concentrating the fight on the much better-armed VRS (Army of Republika Srpska).

On 15 June Visoko was center of preparations for breaking the blockage on nearby Sarajevo. The action was however executed but with no significant gains, only some portion of the territory was liberated but Sarajevo stayed besieged. This big manoeuvre helped ARBiH forces outside Sarajevo to capture whole several towns and villages.

Finally, the Dayton agreement removed all front lines who were all 4 years dangerously close to town itself but never changed considerably, and only changes were made by Visoko's forces by capturing nearby Zimča and other minor hills which only prevented town being surrounded which was accomplished. Visoko itself was heavily damaged; especially, economic resources and factories were purposely hit, damaged and destroyed. The damage to the economy was about $200 million. For four years of war Visoko area units lost 297 soldiers, 600 were wounded and disabled. 23 soldiers from Visoko area got highest ranking in ARBiH Zlatni Ljiljan (Golden Lily), and 19 members of police got Golden Police Star. Civilians also suffered, many of them wounded or killed, although, throughout the whole war, Visoko served as a center for refugees across Bosnia and Herzegovina, as it was considered well defended by their units, thus Visoko was a logistical center of Army BiH because it had industrial capacity and an improvised aerodrome.

Bosnian pyramids claims

Visočica is a hill overlooking the town of Visoko. In October 2005, Bosnian native and author Semir Osmanagić claimed that this hill and several surrounding hills concealed pyramids.

Scientific investigations of the site show there is no pyramid. Additionally, scientists have criticised the Bosnian authorities for supporting the pyramid claim saying, "This scheme is a cruel hoax on an unsuspecting public and has no place in the world of genuine science."

Bosnian archaeologists have asked that the government cancel the digging permits given to Osmanagić and concentrate on work on the medieval town.

Economy

Visoko, experienced intensive modernization during the socialist era until 1991 with industrial exports accounting for a significant proportion of the town's economic activity. Official Yugoslav data from 1991 state that Visoko achieved over 1 million dollars worth of export. The town's economy was led by 20 sizable enterprises operating in the leather and textile industrial sectors led by KTK and Vitex.

Bosnian War left much of industry destroyed where damages are estimated at around 400 million KM (Convertible mark). Still, even the heavy bombardment by artillery and aircraft didn't stop Visoko's industry from producing goods for the army and civil population of Visoko and area.

Post-war economy still relies on leather industry as Prevent employs over 1500 workers and makes products mainly for export for European automobile industry. Food industry Vispak received Guinness certificate on 29 July 2005 for making largest coffee pot in the world. Visoko is traditionally known for its dried meat products like sujuk, and was made at least from the 1750s. Best known product is "Visočka pečenica" which is permanent charcuterie product obtained from high quality parts of beef, dry salted only with kitchen salt and cold smoked and dried. Association of meat processors from Visoko was founded which goal is to create and geographically protect "Visočka pečenica" as a brand with official application submitted on 29 January.

Tourism
From 2006, tens of thousands of tourists have visited Visoko because of Semir Osmanagić discredited Bosnian pyramid claims. The city invested around €250,000 (500,000 KM) for tourism in 2018

Education
There is not much detailed data about medieval universities in the Visoko area, or the place called Bosnia as it was referred to in one of the Vatican archives. It was in 1175 when the university was first mentioned, the high academy of Bosnian religious organization (see Bosnian Church). This university was known for its scholarship in medicine, theology, cosmogeny and ethics. There are four documents that directly or indirectly point to existence of the high academy in the Visoko area. Modern education started with introduction of Rüşdiye's  Ottoman parallel to European high schools of that time, built in 1870, closed after Austro-Hungarian annexation in 1879. Around 1881. new authorities established Municipal schools where classes were held in various houses. In 1910 first proper school was built by the Austro-Hungarian authorities, which still stands today. In 1900 Franciscan gymnasium was relocated from Guča Gora to Visoko. As leather industry played big part in Visoko's economy, in 1929. Leather school was formed.

Society and culture

National monuments and architecture

There are 6 National Monuments of Bosnia and Herzegovina in Visoko:

 Mile, place of gathering of medieval Bosnian nobility, and was one of the places where Stanak was held. 
 Neolithic settlement in Okolište, biggest Butmir culture site. 
 Old town of Visoki, fortress above today's Visoko.
 The architectural ensemble of the Orthodox Church of St Procopius of Scythopolis.
 Franciscan monastery of Saint Bonaventure.
 The architectural ensemble of the Tabačka (Tabačica) mosque in Visoko.

Šerefudin's White Mosque is of great architectural importance to the city and area. The mosque's architect was Zlatko Ugljen. Its most notable award came in 1983, when it received the Aga Khan Award for Architecture.

Museums
In Visoko there is a homeland museum which exhibits the cultural and historic heritage of the Visoko area, and Bosnia. Most of the exhibits are related to the medieval Bosnian state, because the Visoko valley was notable political and economical centre for Bosnian kings. In Goduša there is an extension of the museum where there are antique works of old Goduša's crafts, which are mostly woodcarving.

Health
Visoko has a health centre with polyclinic which was built in 1953. In 2006 polyclinic was modernized with modern laboratory and computer equipment.

Music
In nearby Mulići there is Sevdah Institute of Omer Pobrić, whose mission is to preserve Bosniak music, tradition, and sevdalinka.

Sport

Organized sports began to emerge with the opening of confessional and state schools. In 1909, the Soko society was formed and supported many sports activities. The building of the sports center on 16 June 1934 let developing men and women play volleyball, football, and later handball. Handball club RK Bosna Visoko has won Handball Championship of Bosnia and Herzegovina in 1997 and 1999, and Handball Cup of Bosnia and Herzegovina in 1998 and 2001. In season 1999–2000 they achieved their best international result, losing 48–44 in Eight-finals of EHF Cup, to eventual champions RK Metković Jumbo.

Football club NK Bosna Visoko was the winner of the Bosnia and Herzegovina Football Cup and the Supercup of Bosnia and Herzegovina in 1999. In Yugoslavia, the club managed to enter the Second League in 1963. Aero club "Izet Kurtalić", formed in 1960, was the most successful team in the country, winning numerous domestic and international events.

From 28 February to 2 March 2008 Visoko's hall Mladost was host of Group 2 qualifiers for Futsal World Cup 2008 in Brasil.

Notable people
Adnan Mević, officially the 6 billionth person born, according to the United Nations
Ajas-pasha, Bosniak Ottoman sanjak-bey
Matrakçı Nasuh, 16th-century Bosniak Ottoman mathematician and miniaturist
Mustafa Cerić, ex-Grand Mufti of Bosnia and Herzegovina (1993 to 2012)
Zaim Muzaferija, actor
Slaviša Vukićević, football player
Haris Mujezinović, basketball player
Elvedina Muzaferija, alpine skier
Enes Begović, singer-songwriter
Ognjen Prica (1899–1941), National Hero of Yugoslavia and leftist politician spent his childhood in the town (1900–1912)

Twin towns – sister cities

Visoko is twinned with:
 Altındağ, Turkey
 Bjelovar, Croatia
 Kartal, Turkey

See also
Old town Visoki

Sources
Strategija razvoja općine Visoko

References

 
Municipalities of Zenica-Doboj Canton
Populated places established in the 5th millennium BC
Populated places in Visoko